Cook Neilson (born August 24, 1943) is an American former journalist and motorcycle racer made famous for his win on a Ducati 750SS at Daytona in 1977.  He graduated from Princeton in the mid 1960s, was hired as associate editor of Cycle in September 1967; promoted to editor in 1969, and is credited for making that magazine successful through the 1970s. While at Cycle magazine, he wrote a series of articles on the cookbook construction of a  Top Fuel Harley-Davidson Sportster.

Neilson was inducted into the Ducati North America Hall of Fame, and the AMA Motorcycle Hall of Fame in 2006.

During his racing career, Neilson had thirty-eight starts and nineteen wins; all on the Ducati 750SS.  He also occasionally raced for the Butler & Smith BMW team and the Racecrafter Kawasaki team.  Neilson had three podium finishes at Daytona:  1975 (First), 1976 (Third), and 1977 (First).

In 2006, Ducati Motor Holdings announced a limited edition replica of Neilson's 750SS winning motorcycle, which he had nicknamed "Old Blue."  This motorcycle, named New Blue, will be customized by the NCR racing house based in Bologna.  The race replica is in honor of the 30th anniversary of Neilson's win at Daytona.

Cook crashed a Desmosedici RR, one of 1,500 produced, at a Ducati-sponsored trackday at Putnam Park Roadcourse on September 15, 2008.  He was not injured in the accident.

References

Further reading

External links
 Ducati: Announcement of Cook Neilson Replica

American motorcycle racers
1943 births
Living people
Writers from Wilmington, Delaware
Motorcycling writers
Princeton University alumni